The 1981 Trans America Athletic Conference men's basketball tournament (now known as the ASUN men's basketball tournament) was held March 4–8 at the Hirsch Memorial Coliseum in Shreveport, Louisiana.

 upset top-seeded  in the championship game, 72–67, to win their first TAAC/Atlantic Sun men's basketball tournament. The Bears, in turn, received the TAAC's automatic bid to the 1981 NCAA tournament. This was Mercer's first appearance in the Division I NCAA tournament.

Bracket

References

ASUN men's basketball tournament
Tournament
TAAC men's basketball tournament
TAAC men's basketball tournament